Bryan N. Zollinger is an American attorney and politician who served as a member of the Idaho House of Representatives from the 33rd district from 2016 to 2020.

Early life and education
Zollinger was born and raised in Rexburg, Idaho and graduated from Sugar Salem High School. He earned a Bachelor of Science degree in accounting from the University of Utah and a Juris Doctor from Florida Coastal School of Law.

Career 
Zollinger practices law in Idaho Falls, Idaho. Previously, he served as a trustee for the Idaho Falls School Board.

Idaho House of Representatives
Zollinger along with Mike Kingsley launched Idaho Freedom Caucus, late in the 2017 session. In April 2017, Freedom Caucus collaborated to challenge Governor Butch Otter's veto of the Idaho grocery tax.

In August 2017, Zollinger said that the conspiracy theory that Barack Obama staged the Unite the Right white supremacist rally  was "completely plausible".

In 2017, Zollinger served on the following committees:
Health and Welfare Committee
Judiciary, Rules and Administration Committee
Local Government Committee

Elections 
When Representative Linden B. Bateman chose not to run for reelection the Idaho House, Zollinger announced as a candidate for the House seat. Zollinger won the Republican primary against David Smith with 56.2% of the vote. Zollinger defeated George P. Morrison in the general election with 66.25% of the vote.

Zollinger for 2022 Idaho gubernatorial election serves has Janice McGeachin Region 6 director.

References 

Living people
People from Rexburg, Idaho
University of Utah alumni
Republican Party members of the Idaho House of Representatives
21st-century American politicians
Year of birth missing (living people)